The 2008–09 season of the Belgian First Division (also known as Jupiler Pro League due to sponsorship reasons) was the 106th season of top-tier football in Belgium. The regular season began on 16 August 2008 and ended on 16 May 2009. Standard Liège were the defending champions.

On 19 April 2009, Mons were relegated after Dender beat Roeselare 3–1 and made it mathematically impossible for Mons to climb into 16th position or higher. Tubize were relegated on 3 May 2009 after a 1–1 draw at home to Anderlecht.

The 2008–09 champions were decided in a playoff because Standard and Anderlecht finished the regular season equal on points and number of wins. Standard won the playoff by 2–1 on aggregate and thereby retained the title.

Participating teams
The league consisted of 18 teams, the best 16 teams from last season and two promoted teams from the Second Division.

The number of participants was reduced to 16 teams the season after, hence relegation was increased from two to three or four teams.

Team changes from the previous season
Sint-Truidense and Brussels were relegated to the Second Division at the end of the previous season after finishing in the last two places. They were replaced by Second Division champions Kortrijk and promotion playoff winners Tubize.

Overview

Managerial changes

During summer break

During the season

League standings

Final table

Championship playoff
Since Anderlecht and Standard were tied on both points and wins, a two-legged playoff was played in order to determine the league champions. Standard won the playoff 2–1 on aggregate and were crowned champions.

Positions by matchday
Note: The classification was made after the weekend of each matchday, so postponed matches were only processed at the time they were played to represent the real evolution in standings. These postponed matches are:
 Matchday 1: Mechelen vs. Club Brugge (played between 4th and 5th matchday)
 Matchday 2: Club Brugge vs. Zulte-Waregem (played between 8th and 9th matchday)
 Matchday 13: Kortrijk vs. Zulte-Waregem (played between 16th and 17th matchday)
 Matchday 19: Gent vs. Anderlecht (played between 22nd and 23rd matchday)

Results

Season statistics

Scoring
 First goal of the season:  Dieumerci Mbokani for Standard Liège against Dender (16 August 2008)
 Widest winning margin: 6: Anderlecht 7–1 Mechelen (25 October 2008) and Tubize 0–6 Zulte Waregem (21 February 2009)
 Most goals in a match: 8: Anderlecht 7–1 Mechelen (25 October 2008)
 Hat-tricks scored:
  Idir Ouali for Mouscron against Gent (13 September 2008)
  Nicolás Frutos for Anderlecht against Mechelen (25 October 2008)
  Habib Habibou for Charleroi against Tubize (22 November 2008)
  Jérémy Perbet for Tubize against Kortrijk (29 November 2008)
  Adnan Ćustović for Mouscron against Club Brugge (20 December 2008)
  Chris Makiese for Zulte Waregem against Kortrijk (18 April 2009)

Cards
 First yellow card:  Jimmy Hempte for Kortrijk against Roeselare (16 August 2008)
 First red card:  Karim Belhocine for Kortrijk against Roeselare (16 August 2008)

Goalscorers
Sources: soccerway.com, sport.be 

17 goals (1 player)
 Alfonso Ruiz (Westerlo)

16 goals (2 players)
 Tom De Sutter (Cercle Brugge (7) and Anderlecht (9))
 Dieumerci Mbokani (Standard Liège)

15 goals (1 player)
 Joseph Akpala (Club Brugge)

14 goals (3 players)
 Adnan Ćustović (Mouscron (10) and Gent (4))
 Ouwo Moussa Maazou (Lokeren)
 Wesley Sonck (Club Brugge)

13 goals (2 players)
 Mbaye Leye (Zulte Waregem (9) and Gent (4))
 Jérémy Perbet (Tubize)

12 goals (5 players)

 Mbark Boussoufa (Anderlecht)
  Oleg Iachtchouk (Cercle Brugge)
 Milan Jovanović (Standard Liège)
 Bryan Ruiz (Gent)
 Björn Vleminckx (Mechelen)

11 goals (2 players)
 Elimane Coulibaly (Kortrijk)
 David Destorme (Dender)

10 goals (1 player)
 Giuseppe Rossini (Mechelen)

9 goals (4 players)

 Mohamed Dahmane (Mons (7) and Club Brugge (2))
 Habib Habibou (Charleroi)
 Adékambi Olufadé (Gent)
 Kevin Roelandts (Zulte Waregem)

8 goals (8 players)

 Igor de Camargo (Standard Liège)
 Guillaume Gillet (Anderlecht)
 Faris Haroun (Germinal Beerschot)
 Mustapha Jarju (Mons)
 Ivan Leko (Club Brugge (4) and Germinal Beerschot (4))
 Zlatan Ljubijankić (Gent)
 Marcin Wasilewski (Anderlecht)
 Axel Witsel (Standard Liège)

7 goals (7 players)

 João Carlos (Genk)
 Stijn De Smet (Cercle Brugge)
 Sven Kums (Kortrijk)
 Chris Makiese (Charleroi (1) and Zulte Waregem (6))
 Miloš Marić (Gent)
 Ernest Nfor (Gent (1) and Zulte Waregem (6))
 Norman Sylla (Dender)

6 goals (9 players)

 Grégory Dufer (Tubize)
 Nicolás Frutos (Anderlecht)
 Omer Golan (Lokeren)
 Sherjill MacDonald (Roeselare)
 Sanharib Malki (Germinal Beerschot)
 Thomas Matton (Zulte Waregem)
 Idir Ouali (Mouscron)
 Tim Smolders (Charleroi (4) and Gent (2))
 Kevin Vandenbergh (Germinal Beerschot)

5 goals (14 players)

 Admir Aganović (Dender)
 Willian (Kortrijk)
 Elyaniv Barda (Genk)
 Frederik Boi (Cercle Brugge)
 Honour Gombami (Cercle Brugge)
 Dawid Janczyk (Lokeren)
 Jonathan Legear (Anderlecht)
 Christophe Lepoint (Mouscron)
 Ivan Perišić (Roeselare)
 Jeroen Simaeys (Club Brugge)
 Sulejman Smajić (Dender)
 Bernd Thijs (Gent)
 Bertin Tomou (Westerlo)
 Balázs Tóth (Genk)

4 goals (22 players)

 Franck Berrier (Zulte Waregem)
 Thomas Chatelle (Anderlecht)
 Daniel Chávez (Club Brugge)
 Wilfried Dalmat (Standard Liège)
 Steven Defour (Standard Liège)
 Tom De Mul (Genk)
 Mahamadou Dissa (Roeselare)
 Tosin Dosunmu (Germinal Beerschot)
 Julien Gorius (Mechelen)
 Mouhcine Iajour (Charleroi)
 Jaycee Okwunwanne (Mouscron)
 Roland Juhász (Anderlecht)
 Geoffrey Mujangi Bia (Charleroi)
 Joachim Mununga (Mechelen)
 Adam Nemec (Genk)
 Daniel Pudil (Genk)
 Cyril Théréau (Charleroi)
 Gonzague Van Dooren (Mouscron)
 Vittorio Villano (Tubize)
 Stanislav Vlček (Anderlecht)
 Jelle Vossen (Genk)
 Stef Wils (Westerlo (3) and Gent (1))

3 goals (37 players)

 Antolín Alcaraz (Club Brugge)
 Anele Ngcongca (Genk)
 Randall Azofeifa (Gent)
 Istvan Bakx (Kortrijk)
 Walter Baseggio (Mouscron)
 Christian Benteke (Standard Liège)
 Cédric Bétrémieux (Roeselare (2) and Kortrijk (1))
 Fadel Brahami (Mons)
 Thomas Buffel (Cercle Brugge)
 Dmitri Bulykin (Anderlecht)
 Aboubacar Camara (Lokeren)
 Philippe Clement (Club Brugge)
 Daan De Pever (Dender)
 Nabil Dirar (Club Brugge)
 Christophe Grégoire (Charleroi)
 Moussa Gueye (Mons)
 Jimmy Hempte (Kortrijk)
 Stijn Huysegems (Genk)
 Jonas Ivens (Mechelen)
 Cheikhou Kouyaté (Kortrijk)
 Tim Matthys (Zulte Waregem)
 Ilombe Mboyo (Charleroi)
 Andréa Mbuyi-Mutombo (Zulte Waregem)
 Koen Persoons (Mechelen)
 Obiora Odita (Westerlo)
 Marvin Ogunjimi (Genk)
 Oguchi Onyewu (Standard Liège)
 Abdelmajid Oulmers (Charleroi)
 Mustapha Oussalah (Mouscron)
 Tony Sergeant (Cercle Brugge)
 Valeri Sorokin (Gent (0) and Tubize (3))
 Marko Šuler (Gent)
 Salim Tuama (Standard Liège)
 Jelle Van Damme (Anderlecht)
 Ronald Vargas (Club Brugge)
 Wouter Vrancken (Mechelen)
 Dieter Wittesaele (Dender)

2 goals (33 players)

 Abdessalam Benjelloun (Charleroi (1) and Roeselare (1))
 Lucas Biglia (Anderlecht)
 Mario Carević (Lokeren)
 Cédric Collet (Mons)
 Wouter Corstjens (Westerlo)
 Koen Daerden (Club Brugge)
 Stijn de Wilde (Lokeren)
 Kris De Wree (Germinal Beerschot)
 Mounir Diane (Mons)
 Rachid Farssi (Westerlo)
 Dominic Foley (Gent (2) and Cercle Brugge (0))
 Fred (Dender)
 Bart Goor (Anderlecht (1) and Germinal Beerschot (1))
 Janne Hietanen (Roeselare)
 Oleksandr Iakovenko (Anderlecht)
 Jean-Paul Kielo-Lezi (Mechelen)
 Stijn Meert (Zulte Waregem)
 Pieterjan Monteyne (Germinal Beerschot)
 Dugary Ndabashinze (Genk)
 Vuza Nyoni (Cercle Brugge)
 Azubuike Oliseh (Roeselare)
 Kevin Oris (Mons)
 Sekou Ouattara (Roeselare)
 Killian Overmeire (Lokeren)
 Jan Polák (Anderlecht)
 Roberto Rosales (Gent)
 Wouter Scheelen (Westerlo)
 Serhiy Serebrennikov (Cercle Brugge)
 Dániel Tőzsér (Genk)
 Bart Van Den Eede (Dender)
 Ludwin Van Nieuwenhuyze (Zulte Waregem)
 Lukáš Zelenka (Westerlo)
 Yoav Ziv (Lokeren)

1 goal (77 players)

 Mozes Adams (Westerlo)
 Karim Belhocine (Kortrijk)
 Leon Benko (Standard Liège)
 Víctor Bernárdez (Anderlecht)
 Sylvain Berton (Mouscron)
 Siebe Blondelle (Dender)
 Ludovic Buyssens (Mons)
 Jean-Philippe Caillet (Genk)
 Fabien Camus (Charleroi)
 Janis Coppin (Zulte Waregem)
 Alessandro Cordaro (Mons)
 Daniel Cruz (Germinal Beerschot)
 Jusuf Dajić (Tubize)
 Dante (Standard Liège)
 Wim De Decker (Genk (0) and Germinal Beerschot (1))
 Dieter Dekelver (Westerlo)
 Bram de Ly (Kortrijk)
 Boubacar Dembélé (Roeselare)
 Steven de Petter (Dender)
 Joeri Dequevy (Roeselare)
 Jonas de Roeck (Gent)
 Karel D'Haene (Zulte Waregem)
 Didier Dheedene (Germinal Beerschot)
 Frédéric Dupré (Lokeren)
 Chemcedine El Araichi (Mouscron)
 Karel Geraerts (Club Brugge)
 Kevin Geudens (Mechelen)
 Réginal Goreux (Standard Liège)
 Christophe Grondin (Gent)
 Romain Haghedooren (Mouscron)
 Alan Haydock (Tubize)
 Kristof Imschoot (Mechelen)
 Steven Jacobs (Dender)
 Frédéric Jay (Mons)
 Torben Joneleit (Charleroi)
 Yasin Karaca (Tubize)
 Mahamoudou Kéré (Charleroi)
 Paul Kpaka (Germinal Beerschot)
 Mladen Lazarević (Roeselare)
 Hernán Losada (Anderlecht)
 Marcel Mbayo (Lokeren)
 Damien Miceli (Charleroi)
 Damir Mirvić (Roeselare)
 Jimmy Mulisa (Roeselare)
 Henri Munyaneza (Germinal Beerschot)
 Roy Myrie (Gent)
 Arsène Né (Germinal Beerschot)
 Grégoire Neels (Tubize)
 Benjamin Nicaise (Standard Liège)
 Antti Okkonen (Mons)
 King Gyan Osei (Germinal Beerschot)
 Jean-Baptiste Paternotte (Tubize)
 Nebojša Pavlović (Lokeren)
 Anthony Portier (Cercle Brugge)
 Silvio Proto (Germinal Beerschot)
 Vincent Provoost (Roeselare)
 Vincent Ramaël (Tubize)
 Bassilia Sakanoko (Mouscron)
 Santiago (Tubize)
 Mohamed Sarr (Standard Liège)
 Asanda Sishuba (Mouscron)
 Björn Smits (Roeselare)
 Tom Soetaers (Genk)
 Avi Strool (Lokeren)
 Matías Suárez (Anderlecht)
 Danijel Subotić (Zulte Waregem)
 Đorđe Svetličić (Germinal Beerschot)
 Jérémy Taravel (Zulte Waregem)
 Arturo ten Heuvel (Roeselare)
 Kenny Thompson (Gent)
 Ode Thompson (Roeselare)
 Romeo Van Dessel (Mechelen)
 Brecht Verbrugghe (Kortrijk)
 Jonathan Walasiak (Mouscron)
 Justice Wamfor (Germinal Beerschot)
 Hiraç Yagan (Standard Liège)
 Ervin Zukanović (Dender)

Own goals  (17 players, 18 goals)

 Antolín Alcaraz (Club Brugge, scored for Charleroi)
 Yohan Brouckaert (Tubize, scored for Westerlo)
 Frank Defays (Charleroi, scored for Tubize)
 Jonas De Roeck (Gent, scored for Westerlo)
 Karel D'Haene (Zulte Waregem, scored for Westerlo)
 Chemcedine El Araichi (Mouscron, scored for Tubize)
 Janne Hietanen (Roeselare, scored for Kortrijk)
 Bojan Jorgacević (Gent, scored for Mechelen)
 Damien Miceli (Charleroi, scored for Cercle Brugge)
 Tomislav Mikulić (Standard Liège, scored for Mechelen)
 Grégoire Neels (Tubize, scored for Westerlo)
 Oguchi Onyewu (Standard Liège, scored for Dender)
 Rocky Peeters (Germinal Beerschot, scored for Charleroi and Zulte Waregem)
 Anthony Portier (Cercle Brugge, scored for Charleroi)
 Jérémy Taravel (Zulte Waregem, scored for Germinal Beerschot)
 Kenny Van Hoevelen (Mechelen, scored for Mouscron)
 Stef Wils (Westerlo, scored for Dender)

See also
 2008–09 R.S.C. Anderlecht season
 List of Belgian football transfers summer 2008
 List of Belgian football transfers winter 2008–09

References

Belgian Pro League seasons
Belgian
1